The Native Diver Stakes is a Grade III American thoroughbred horse race for three-years-old and older over a distance of one and one eighth miles on the dirt held annually in late November at Del Mar Racetrack in Del Mar, California. The event offers a purse of $100,000.

History

The race is named for one of the great sprinters and one of California’s most favorite horses, Native Diver, who ranks 60th in Blood-Horse magazine List of the Top 100 U.S. Racehorses of the 20th Century.

The event was inaugurated on 6 May 1979 with a recorded crowd of 30,857 in attendance as the Native Diver Handicap at Hollywood Park Racetrack over the one mile distance and was won by the six year old Life's Hope who was trained by the US Hall of Fame trainer Laz Barrera and ridden by the US Hall of Fame jockey Laffit Pincay Jr. in a time of 1:35 flat. The event was classified as Grade II for the first running but the following year it was downgraded to Grade III. The event has remained at that classification.

The 1981 running was scheduled for the Hollywood Park Fall meeting and held on Thanksgiving Day weekend.

The distance of the event was increased to  miles in 1982 then reverted to 1 mile in 1984. In 1986 the distance was set at  miles and has remained at that to date. 
From 2006 to 2014 it was held on a synthetic dirt surface.

In the 2008 edition, Slew's Tizzy set a new Hollywood Park record for the all weather track for  miles with a winning time of 1:46.78.  The time however was not faster than the dirt stakes record which was set by the 1995 Argentine three year old champion Gentlemen (ARG) in the 1996 when he won by nine lengths in 1:45.35.

The event was run as a handicap prior to 2012.

With the closure of Hollywood Park Racetrack in 2013 the event was moved to Del Mar Racetrack.

Records
Speed record:
 miles:  1:45.35   – Gentlemen (ARG)    (1996)
1 miles: 1:33.40  - 	Innamorato  (1985)

Margins:
9 lengths – Gentlemen (ARG)    (1996)

Most wins:
 no horse with more than one win

Most wins by an owner:
 2 – Elmendorf Farm (1980, 1981)
 2 – Golden Eagle Farm (1994, 1999)
 2 – C R K Stable  (2011, 2019)

Most wins by a jockey:
 7 – Chris McCarron (1981, 1989, 1990, 1991, 1992, 1994, 1999)

Most wins by a trainer:
 7 – Richard E. Mandella (1983, 1986, 1994, 1996, 1997, 1998, 2003)

Winners

Legend:

See also
 List of American and Canadian Graded races

External links
 2020 Del Mar Media Guide

References

Horse races in California
Graded stakes races in the United States
Grade 3 stakes races in the United States
1979 establishments in California
Recurring sporting events established in 1979
Del Mar Racetrack